Russell Dingwall (born 26 June 1997) is a Scottish professional footballer who plays as a midfielder for Elgin City. Dingwall has also previously played for Ross County as well as Forfar Athletic and Stenhousemuir on loan.

Career

Ross County
Dingwall was part of the Ross County Under-20s team that won the 2016–17 SPFL Development League for the first time in the club's history and after interest from clubs such as Valencia this earned him a professional contract with the club in 2017. He made his professional debut for Ross County coming off the bench to replace Jim O'Brien against Kilmarnock in the Scottish Premiership on 20 May 2017, playing the final seven minutes of the match. He received the man of the match award for this brief cameo.

Forfar (loan)
On 26 January 2018 Dingwall joined Scottish League 1 side Forfar Athletic for the rest of the season along with teammate Ross Maciver.

Personal life
Russell's brother Tony is also a professional footballer and currently plays for Brora Rangers.

Career statistics

References

1997 births
Living people
Footballers from Inverness
Scottish footballers
Association football forwards
Ross County F.C. players
Scottish Professional Football League players
Forfar Athletic F.C. players
Stenhousemuir F.C. players
Elgin City F.C. players